is a former Japanese football player. He played for Japan national team.

Club career
Kunieda was born in Hiroshima Prefecture on September 18, 1944. After graduating from Chuo University, he joined his local club Toyo Industries in 1967. The club won the league champions in 1967, 1968 and 1970. The club also won 1967, 1969 Emperor's Cup. He retired in 1972. He played 38 games and scored 3 goals in the league.

National team career
In October 1969, Kunieda was selected Japan national team for 1970 World Cup qualification. At this qualification, on October 16, he debuted against Australia. On October 18, he also played against South Korea. He played 2 games for Japan in 1969.

National team statistics

References

External links
 
 Japan National Football Team Database

1944 births
Living people
Chuo University alumni
Association football people from Hiroshima Prefecture
Japanese footballers
Japan international footballers
Japan Soccer League players
Sanfrecce Hiroshima players
Association football defenders